The 2007 AFC Futsal Championship was held in Osaka and Amagasaki, Japan from 13 May to 19 May 2007.

Qualification

Venues

Draw 
The draw for the 2007 AFC Futsal Championship was held on 11 April 2007 in Tokyo, Japan.

Group stage

Group A

Group B

Group C

Group D

Knockout stage

Quarter-finals

Semi-finals

Third place play-off

Final

Awards 

 Most Valuable Player
 Vahid Shamsaei
 Top Scorer
 Kenichiro Kogure (12 goals)
 Fair-Play Award

 All-Star Team
 Mostafa Nazari (GK)
 Mohammad Reza Heidarian
 Vahid Shamsaei
 Kenichiro Kogure
 Kazem Mohammadi
Coach:  Hossein Shams (Iran)

Goalscorers
12 goals
  Kenichiro Kogure

11 goals

  Vahid Shamsaei
  Abdulla Buriev

8 goals
  Mohammad Hashemzadeh

7 goals
  Mohammad Taheri

6 goals

  Takuya Suzumura
  Khaled Takaji
  Panuwat Janta

5 goals

  Majid Latifi
  Ahmad Pariazar
  Hayssam Atwi

4 goals

  Javad Asghari Moghaddam
  Kazem Mohammadi
  Ricardo Higa
  Yuki Kanayama
  Yusuke Komiyama
  Daisuke Ono
  Daniar Abdyraimov
  Nurjan Djetybaev
  Andrey Pestryakov
  Sherzod Jumaev
  Ekkapan Suratsawang

3 goals

  Hashim Khalid
  Kenta Fujii
  Back Hyung-do
  Jenish Mamatov
  Rabih Abou-Chaaya
  Panomkorn Saisorn
  Ekkapong Suratsawang

2 goals

  Matthew Whyte
  Lachlan Wright
  Kwok Yue Hung
  So Sheung Kwai
  Babak Masoumi
  Mohammad Reza Zahmatkesh
  Hussein Abd-Ali
  Abdul-Karim Ghazi
  Goshi Koyama
  Hamed Al-Otaibi
  Hamad Al-Othman
  Marat Duvanaev
  Mahmoud Itani
  Fadzil Karnim
  Peyman Nejadsafavi
  Ariel Zerrudo
  Lee Jong-yun
  Firdavs Faizullaev
  Rustam Khojaev
  Alisher Ulmasov
  Sermphan Khumthinkaew
  Anucha Munjarern
  Nikolay Odushev
  Hurshid Tajibaev
  Farruh Zakirov

1 goal

  Luke Haydon
  Adrian Vizzari
  Hu Jie
  Li Xin
  Zhang Jiong
  Zhang Xiao
  Chu Kwok Leung
  Lo Kwan Yee
  So Loi Keung
  Mohammad Reza Heidarian
  Mohammad Keshavarz
  Mohammed Abbas
  Waleed Khalil
  Takeshi Kishimoto
  Wataru Kitahara
  Mohammed Al-Nagi
  Vadim Cherevin
  Azamat Mendibaev
  Ulan Ryskulov
  Mohammad Iskandarani
  Francois Kharma
  Serge Said
  Feroz Karnim
  Choi Yong-sun
  Jeun Jun-young
  Kim In-woo
  Uvaydo Davlatbekov
  Prasert Innui
  Lertchai Issarasuwipakorn
  Joe Nueangkord
  Guvanch Kanayev
  Mergen Orazov
  Agajan Resulov
  Elman Tagayev
  Anvar Mamedov
  Ilhom Yusupdjanov

Own goals
  Jenish Mamatov (for South Korea)

References

 AFC
 RSSSF
 www.futsalplanet.com
 AFC Futsal Championship 2007 Technical Report

AFC Futsal Championship
F
Championship
International futsal competitions hosted by Japan
Sport in Osaka